Zoltán Cséfalvay is a Hungarian politician, economist and geographer. He served as Secretary of State for Strategy with the Ministry of the National Economy of Hungary, and later as Hungary's ambassador to UNESCO and the OECD.

Education 
Born in Máriakálnok, Hungary in 1958, Zoltán Cséfalvay attended the University of Debrecen from 1977 to 1982, and between 1987 and 1988, he held a German Academic Exchange Service grant at the Ludwig Maximilian University of Munich. He received his PhD in geography from the Hungarian Academy of Sciences in 1996. The University of Debrecen awarded him his habilitation in 1999.

Career

First Orbán government 
He was appointed Deputy Secretary of State for Regional Economic Development in the First Orbán government under Minister for Economic Affairs György Matolcsy.

Second Orbán government 
In 2010, he was appointed Minister of State for the National Economy, where he served as the ministry's Parliamentary Secretary as well. During this period, he managed the negotiations with the International Monetary Fund and the European Commission in addressing the Hungarian deficit crisis.

Joint ambassador to UNESCO and OECD 
He presented his credentials as Hungary's permanent representative to the OECD and Hungary's ambassador extraordinary and plenipotentiary to UNESCO in January 2015.

JRC Seville 
After the end of his posting with UNESCO and OECD, he took up a senior grantholder's position in December 2018 at the European Commission's Joint Research Centre in Seville, Spain, where his work focused on the impact of robotics on European industry and the economic drivers of competitiveness.

Awards and recognition 
In 2014, he was awarded the Knight's Cross of the Order of Merit of the Republic of Poland in recognition of his work in the field of Polish-Hungarian bilateral economic cooperation.

Personal life 
He is married to the Hungarian social scientist and university lecturer Anna Mária Bartal. They have one son.

References 

Hungarian politicians
Government of Hungary
Ambassadors of Hungary
1958 births
Living people